King Mongkut's Institute of Technology is a system of technology-oriented universities in Thailand. Currently there are three universities in the system:

 King Mongkut's Institute of Technology Ladkrabang (KMITL)
 King Mongkut's Institute of Technology North Bangkok (KMITNB)
 King Mongkut's University of Technology Thonburi (KMUTT)